Art Siadziba (bel. "Арт Сядзіба", eng. Art Headquarters) is an independent public cultural initiative in Belarus. It is a network of public open spaces (libraries, galleries) for independent events.

It was created with a similar spirit to the network of Las bibliotecas independientes en Cuba

Art-Siadziba (Minsk)  is located in Minsk, in the factory building of "Horizont".

It is a legal registered organisation. Between December 2011 and April 2012 more than 60 different events were organized: political, public meetings, academic seminars and training sessions, informal conferences, press briefings, and concerts.

Founders 
Among founders:
 Stas Babaytsau
 journalist, public activist Franak Viachorka
 leader of Amaroka-Band Dzmitry Afanasiyenka
 cultural manager Pavel Byelavus
 singer Pyotr Klyuyeu
 singer, hip-hop musician Vinsent
 Belarusian artist  Alyaksyey Marachkin

References

External links 
 
 Сядзіба Гарызонт, 34mag
 Арт-Сядзіба. Творческое пространство в центре Минска

Belarusian culture